Miroslav Jemelka (born July 28, 1931, Olomouc † May 22, 2021, in Furth im Wald) is a Czechoslovak sprint canoer who competed in the late 1950s. At the 1956 Summer Olympics in Melbourne, he finished sixth in the K-2 10000 m and eight in the K-2 1000 m events with Rudolf Klabouch.

References
Sports-reference.com profile

1931 births
Canoeists at the 1956 Summer Olympics
Czechoslovak male canoeists
Living people
Olympic canoeists of Czechoslovakia
Sportspeople from Olomouc